In basketball, a double-double is a single-game performance in which a player accumulates ten or more in two of the following five statistical categories: points, rebounds, assists, steals, and blocked shots. The first "double" in the term refers to the two (double) categories and the second "double" refers to accumulating ten or more (typically double digits) in that category. Similarly, a player records a triple-double, quadruple-double, and quintuple-double when accumulating ten or more in three, four, or all five of the statistical categories, respectively. While double-doubles and triple-doubles occur regularly each NBA season, only four quadruple-doubles have ever officially been recorded in the NBA, and no quintuple-double has ever been recorded in a professional basketball game. A similar term, the five-by-five, is the accumulation of at least five in all five statistical categories. It is rarely done.

Double-double
A double-double is a performance in which a player accumulates a double-digit total in two of five statistical categories—points, rebounds, assists, steals, and blocked shots—in a game. The most common double-double combination is points and rebounds, followed by points and assists. During the 2008–09 NBA season, 69 players who were eligible for leadership in the main statistical categories recorded at least ten double-doubles during the season.

Since the  season, Tim Duncan leads the National Basketball Association (NBA) in the points–rebounds combination with 841 double-doubles, John Stockton leads the points–assists combination with 714, and Russell Westbrook leads the rebounds–assists combinations with 142. Since the  season, Tim Duncan also holds the record for most total career double-doubles in the NBA, having recorded 841. In league history, the record for most career double-doubles is 968, held by Wilt Chamberlain.

Special double-doubles are rare. One such achievement is sometimes called a 20–20, double double-double, or double-20, when a player accumulates 20 or more in two statistics in a game. Another similar feat is a 30–30. The only player in NBA history to record a 40–40 is Wilt Chamberlain, who achieved the feat eight times in his career, four of which were in his rookie season.

Longest continuous streak of double-doubles: According to the Elias Sports Bureau, Wilt Chamberlain holds the record with 227 consecutive double-doubles from 1964 to 1967. Chamberlain also holds the second- and third-longest continuous streaks of double-doubles with 220 and 133. This record is before the ABA–NBA merger in 1976. The longest streak of double-doubles since the merger was 53 games, achieved by Kevin Love, then of the Minnesota Timberwolves.
Youngest player: Tracy McGrady (Toronto Raptors), aged 18 years and 175 days, logged a double-double on November 15, 1997, versus the Indiana Pacers. He had ten points and 11 rebounds.
Oldest player: Dikembe Mutombo (Houston Rockets), aged 42 years and 289 days, logged a double-double on April 10, 2009, versus the Golden State Warriors. He had ten points and 15 rebounds.

Triple-double

A triple-double is a single-game performance by a player who accumulates a double-digit number total in three of five statistical categories—points, rebounds, assists, steals, and blocked shots—in a game. The most common way for a player to achieve a triple-double is with points, rebounds, and assists, though on occasion players may record 10 or more steals or blocked shots in a game. The origin of the term "triple-double" is unclear. Some sources claim that it was coined in the NBA by former Los Angeles Lakers public relations director Bruce Jolesch in the 1980s in order to showcase Magic Johnson's versatility, while others claim that it was coined by then Philadelphia 76ers media relations director Harvey Pollack in 1980.

Triple-doubles in the NBA

That season, there were 32 triple-doubles, 12 more than the previous season. This can be largely attributed to Magic Johnson, who was responsible for 137 of this time-span's triple-doubles, or about 25.23% of them. After Johnson retired in 1991, the number of triple-doubles in the league declined. Jason Kidd recorded the most triple-doubles in this timespan with 107, which was 68 more than second placed LeBron James. Over those three years, Russell Westbrook recorded 101 triple-doubles—28.69% of all triple-doubles in that timespan.

There has been occasional controversy surrounding triple-doubles made when a player achieves the feat with a late rebound. Players with nine rebounds in a game have sometimes been accused of deliberately missing a shot late in the game in order to recover the rebound. One such case involved a player shooting at his own team's basket. On March 16, 2003, the Cleveland Cavaliers were up 120–95 against the Utah Jazz with four seconds left in the fourth quarter. Following an inbounded ball, Cavaliers guard Ricky Davis shot the ball off his own team's basket to secure the final rebound for a triple double. The move was criticized by players, coaches, and the media. To deter this, NBA rules allow rebounds to be nullified if the shot is determined not to be a legitimate scoring attempt.

Russell Westbrook holds the NBA record for career triple-doubles with 198. He and Oscar Robertson are the only two players to average a triple-double over a season, with Robertson achieving the feat once and Westbrook achieving the feat four times.

WNBA

Triple-doubles have been far more rare in the WNBA than in the NBA; the games are shorter in the WNBA (40 minutes vs 48), there are fewer teams and fewer games in a season (36 vs 82), and the playing style in the WNBA is more of a team game than relying on star players. As of the 2022 season, 20 triple-doubles have been recorded in the WNBA — 16 in the regular season and four in the playoffs. Sheryl Swoopes, and Courtney Vandersloot are tied for third place with two WNBA triple-doubles, while Candace Parker and Sabrina Ionescu are tied for second place with three, and Alyssa Thomas has the all-time record at four.

On June 12, 2022 in a New York Liberty game, Ionescu became the fourth and youngest WNBA player to achieve multiple triple doubles in a career, while also being the first to both achieve a triple double in three quarters and register at least 12 of each statistic for the triple double.

With her third triple double on June 23, 2022, Parker became both the first person to reach three triple doubles overall, as well as achieve two or more triple doubles in the same season.

Alyssa Thomas scored the third overall playoff triple-double and first WNBA Finals triple-double on September 15, 2022 against the Las Vegas Aces, and the fourth the following game on September 18. Thomas recorded all four of her career triple-doubles in the 2022 season.

The following is a list of all WNBA triple-doubles, with the playoff triple-doubles highlighted in italics. Bold numbers indicate the statistic relevant to the triple double.

NCAA Division I

Most triple-doubles in a career:
 Men's: Kyle Collinsworth (BYU, 2010–11, 2013–16) with 12 — six in 2014–15 and six again as a senior in 2015–16. Before the triple-double being tracked as an NCAA statistic, Oscar Robertson (Cincinnati) had 10—five in 1958–59 and five in 1959–60.
 Although BYU was forced to vacate all but one of its wins in the 2015–16 season due to improper benefits provided by boosters to another BYU player, Collinsworth's triple-double record was not affected.
 Women's: Sabrina Ionescu (Oregon, 2016–2020) with 26 – four in 2016–17, six in 2017–18, eight in 2018–19, and eight in 2019–20.
Consecutive triple-doubles: In Division I men's play, David Edwards (Texas A&M), Penny Hardaway (Memphis State), Tony Lee (Robert Morris), Gerald Lewis (SMU), Shaquille O’Neal (LSU), and Kevin Roberson (Vermont) each recorded two consecutive games with a triple-double.

In women's play, Danielle Carson (Youngstown State), Kim Rhock (Mount St. Mary's), Nicole Powell (Stanford), Ashley Schrock (Cleveland State), Claire Faucher (Portland State), Brittney Griner (Baylor), and Ny Hammonds (Charlotte) have accomplished this feat once. Powell did so in successive rounds of the NCAA tournament. Sabrina Ionescu has done so twice, and Chastadie Barrs of Lamar has done so three times, making them the only D-I players of either sex to do so more than once. Barrs is the only player to have recorded consecutive triple-doubles twice in a single season, doing so in 2018–19.
 Two women are the only NCAA players of either sex in any division to have recorded three consecutive triple-doubles. The first was Carson in the 1985–86 season. She began by recording 12 points, ten, rebounds, and 12 assists against Akron on November 29, 1985. The following day, she recorded 20 points, 12 rebounds, and at least 20 assists against Kent State (her exact assists total in that game is unknown). Finally, on December 2 against Cleveland State, Carson recorded 26 points, 15 rebounds, and 14 assists. Barrs matched the feat in the 2018–19 season. She began with 17 points, ten rebounds, and 12 steals on January 9, 2019 against New Orleans. Next, on January 12, Barrs had ten points, 11 rebounds, and ten assists against Central Arkansas. Finally, on January 16, Barrs recorded 15 points, ten rebounds, and 11 assists against Southeastern Louisiana.

Most triple-doubles in a single season:
 Men's: Kyle Collinsworth (BYU), with six – performed twice: in the 2014–15 season, and again in 2015–16.
 Women's: Sabrina Ionescu (Oregon), with eight in the 2018–19 season.
 Triple-doubles in NCAA tournament history:
 Men's
 The NCAA first recorded individual assists in men's basketball in 1950–51, but stopped doing so after the 1951–52 season, and did not resume keeping track of assists until 1983–84. Blocks and steals were first recorded in 1985–86. Thus, the NCAA officially records nine tournament triple-doubles. However, many tournaments had included assists, steals and blocks in their official boxscores prior to that time, so unofficially this has occurred 17 times. Only three pre-1986 triple-doubles are included below.

 Women's
 In women's basketball, the NCAA began keeping track of assists in 1985–86, then blocks and steals in 1987–88, so officially this has occurred 14 times. However, many tournaments had included assists, steals and blocks in their official boxscores prior to that time, so unofficially this has occurred 17 times. All three triple-doubles that preceded the NCAA's official inclusion of the relevant statistics are included below.

Others
Kalara McFadyen of Memphis achieved perhaps the most unusual triple-double in history, and she did it without scoring a point or even attempting a shot from either the field or the free-throw line. On February 3, 2002, in a women's Division I game against Charlotte, she had 12 assists, 10 steals, and 10 rebounds.

FIBA European Champions Cup and EuroLeague

Much like the WNBA, there are a few reasons why triple-doubles are far more rare in the EuroLeague than in the NBA. The games are 40 minutes long—8 minutes shorter than in the NBA—there are 30 games in a season compared to the NBA's 82, and various rules—such as those on assists—are stricter than that of the NBA. As of 2019, only seven triple-doubles have been recorded in Euroleague history, and only three in the modern era of Euroleague basketball (since 2000). The following is a list of all seven of these triple-doubles:

Quadruple-double

A quadruple-double is a single-game performance by a player who accumulates ten or more in four of five statistical categories—points, rebounds, assists, steals, and blocked shots—in a game. This feat is extremely rare: only four players have officially recorded a quadruple-double in National Basketball Association (NBA) history. The first American male player above the high school level to officially record a quadruple-double was Nate Thurmond, who achieved this feat in 1974 while playing for the NBA's Chicago Bulls. The first American female player above the high school level to officially record a quadruple-double was Ann Meyers, who achieved this feat in 1978 while playing for the UCLA Bruins, when women's college sports were under the auspices of the AIAW. 

The first male player in NCAA Division I history to record a quadruple-double was Lester Hudson in 2007. The first Division I women's player to have officially recorded a quadruple-double since the NCAA began sponsoring women's sports in 1981–82 was Veronica Pettry of Loyola–Chicago in 1989. Only three other women have done so since, and the only player to have recorded a quadruple-double since 1993 is Shakyla Hill of Grambling State, who accomplished the feat in 2018 and 2019. An earlier player, Jackie Spencer of Louisville, accomplished the feat against Cincinnati during the 1984–85 season, but the NCAA did not record assists and steals throughout Division I women's basketball at that time. The Metro Conference, then home to both schools, did officially record these statistics, but the NCAA did not start doing so until 1985–86 for assists and 1987–88 for steals.

NBA
Quadruple-doubles have only been possible since the 1973–74 season, when the NBA started recording both blocked shots and steals. It is often speculated by observers that other all-time greats, namely Oscar Robertson (former all time triple-doubles leader with 181, now Russell Westbrook), Wilt Chamberlain, Bill Russell, and Jerry West could conceivably have had quadruple-doubles. West's biography at NBA.com claims that he once recorded an unofficial quadruple-double with 44 points, 12 rebounds, ten assists, and ten blocks. A biography of Wilt Chamberlain claims that he also recorded an unofficial quadruple-double in Game 1 of the 1967 Eastern Division Finals against the Boston Celtics, when he had 24 points, 32 rebounds, 13 assists, and 12 blocks.

The four players listed below are the only players who have officially recorded a quadruple-double in an NBA game. Except for Thurmond, who retired before the award was established in 1983, all of them have won NBA Defensive Player of the Year at least once. Robertson is the only player who was not a center to accomplish the feat, doing so with steals rather than blocks.
Legend
 * : Inducted into the Naismith Memorial Basketball Hall of Fame

Only seven other players (Drexler did it twice) have managed to finish with triple-doubles and a total of 9 in a fourth statistical category (statistical categories in which they fell short are in bold):

Notes
 Bird sat out the entire fourth quarter. After three quarters, head coach K. C. Jones informed Bird that he was one steal away from a quadruple-double and asked if he wanted to stay in the game. Bird declined, saying that he "already did enough damage."
 Olajuwon was credited with 9 assists in the original box score. However, after Rockets officials reviewed the game tape and discovered what they believe was an uncredited assist in the first quarter, they revised the box score, crediting Olajuwon with 10 assists and the third quadruple-double in NBA history. NBA's director of operations, Rod Thorn, requested to review the tape. After reviewing the tape, the league disallowed Olajuwon's quadruple-double and announced that his original line—with 9 assists—is official.

Other men's basketball

Notes
 This is the only quadruple-double in French National League history.
 This is the only quadruple-double in National Basketball League history.
 This is the only quadruple-double in NCAA Division I men's basketball history. The opponent, Central Baptist, plays in the NAIA.

Women's basketball
 Mostly accurate . NCAA records are complete for Divisions I and II, but not for Division III; specifically, entering the 2018–19 season, there have been a total of eight quadruple-doubles in Division III play, and one player, Suzy Venet of Mount Union (1994–1998), had two in her career, both in the 1996–97 season. NAIA records are also incomplete.

Notes

Quintuple-double
A quintuple-double is a single-game performance by a player who accumulates a double-digits in all five statistical categories—points, rebounds, assists, steals, and blocked shots—in a single game. There are only three known officially recorded quintuple-doubles, all done at the girls' high-school level. The first was recorded by Tamika Catchings of Duncanville High School (Duncanville, Texas) with 25 points, 18 rebounds, 11 assists, 10 steals, and 10 blocks in 1997. The second was by Alex Montgomery of Lincoln High School (Tacoma, Washington), who had 27 points, 22 rebounds, 10 assists, 10 steals, and 10 blocks in January 2007. The third was by Aimee Oertner of Northern Lehigh High School (Slatington, Pennsylvania), who had 26 points, 20 rebounds, 10 assists, 10 steals, and 11 blocks on January 7, 2012. 

Wilt Chamberlain allegedly recorded a quintuple-double on March 18, 1968 with 53 points, 32 rebounds, 14 assists, 24 blocks, and 11 steals. However, before 1974, prior to Chamberlain's retirement, steals and blocks were not officially recorded by the NBA. Statistician Harvey Pollack, who spectated the game, reported that Chamberlain might have had more than one quintuple-double.

Hakeem Olajuwon may have come the closest to recording an official quintuple-double in an NBA game. On March 10, 1987, he recorded 38 points, 17 rebounds, 6 assists, 7 steals, and 12 blocks in a double overtime loss to the Seattle Supersonics. On March 3, 1990, Olajuwon recorded 29 points, 18 rebounds, 9 assists, 5 steals, and 11 blocks in a win over the Golden State Warriors.

As of January 2023, there is no overlap between the 14 players who have recorded 10+ steals in an NBA game and the 36 players who have recorded 10+ blocks in a game; in other words, no NBA player's career-high stat line is a quintuple-double. The best single-game career high in blocks for a player with a game of 10+ steals is 6 (Kendall Gill, Draymond Green, and Michael Jordan), and the best single-game career high in steals for a player with a game of 10+ blocks is 8 (Andrei Kirilenko and Hakeem Olajuwon).

Five-by-five
A five-by-five is a performance in which a player accumulates a total of five in five statistical categories—points, rebounds, assists, steals, and blocks—in a single game. Statistics for steals and blocks were not kept in the NBA until the 1973–74 season, so all NBA five-by-fives are known only from that season onward. Hakeem Olajuwon (six times) and Andrei Kirilenko (three times) are the only players to have recorded multiple five-by-fives (based on records since the  season). Both are also the only players to record six-by-fives (at least six in all five statistical categories). Only twice has a five-by-five coincided with a triple-double (both by Olajuwon, one of which was 1 assist shy of a quadruple-double) and only three times has a player recorded a five-by-five without registering at least a double-double (two by Kirilenko and one by Marcus Camby).

Facts
All facts based on data since the  season:
Greatest five-by-fives (most of each stat): Hakeem Olajuwon, on March 10, 1987, became the first in NBA history to record a six-by-five (at least 6 each of all five statistics: points, rebounds, assists, blocks, steals). It took nearly twenty years for the second official occurrence in NBA history. Andrei Kirilenko, on January 3, 2006, recorded a six-by-five against the Lakers. Though his numbers were not quite as impressive as Olajuwon's, Kirilenko performed the feat in regulation.
Most five-by-fives in a career: Hakeem Olajuwon leads all players with 6 career five-by-fives. Andrei Kirilenko, with 3, is the only other player with more than one career five-by-five.
Most five-by-fives in the same season: Only twice has a player recorded two five-by-fives in a season. Olajuwon in the 1993–94 season, and Kirilenko in the 2003–04 season.
Quickest pair of five-by-fives: Kirilenko performed a five-by-five on December 3, 2003, and completed another just a week later, on December 10, 2003. The second-quickest five-by-fives were completed by Olajuwon on November 5, 1993, and another, 55 days later, on December 30, 1993.
Youngest player: Kirilenko's first NBA five-by-five came on December 3, 2003, making him the youngest to record a five-by-five at age .
Oldest player: Olajuwon is the oldest player to record a five-by-five. His last career five-by-five came on December 30, 1993, at which time he was  old.
Six-by-fives: Olajuwon and Kirilenko are the only players to achieve this feat in NBA history.

References

Basketball terminology
Basketball statistics